The multi-coloured tree frog or multi-coloured frog (Nyctimystes multicolor) is a species of frog in the subfamily Pelodryadinae. It is endemic to West Papua, Indonesia.
Its natural habitats are subtropical or tropical moist lowland forests, subtropical or tropical moist montane forests, swamps, and freshwater marshes.
It is threatened by habitat loss.

References

External links

Nyctimystes
Amphibians of Western New Guinea
Taxonomy articles created by Polbot
Amphibians described in 2004